Various Artists – Archives Vol. 4 is a collection of songs Steve Vai has contributed to other projects and records including Public Image Ltd, tracks from the Jimi Hendrix tribute In From The Storm with the London Symphony Orchestra, and a collaboration with Chick Corea from The Songs Of West Side Story, among others.

Originally only available through Vai.com as Volume 5 "The Secret Jewel Box", this album was re-released by Favored Nations in 2005. The CD booklet features Steve’s commentary on each track.

Track listing

More Information
Allmusic
Discogs
www.vai.com

References

2003 compilation albums
Steve Vai albums
Heavy metal compilation albums
Instrumental rock compilation albums
Hard rock compilation albums